Carl Christian Ferdinand Wentorf (25 April 1863 – 24 November 1914) was a Danish painter. His works included genre pieces and portraits. He won the Royal Danish Art Academy's Annual Medal in 1901.

Biography

Carl Wentorf was born in Copenhagen, the son of furnituremaker  Heinrich Frederik Wentorf and Cecilie Juditha (née) Wandschneider. He attended the Royal Danish Academy of Fine Arts from 1881 to 1887. He had his debut at the Charlottenborg Exhibition in 1897 with a portrait of the landscape painter Carl Frederik Aagaard.

He travelled widely in the 1890s with economic support both from the Academy and Det Ancherske Legat, especially to Germany, France, Italy and the Netherlands..

Wentorf exhibited regularly at Charlottenborg as well as at a number of exhibitions abroad. His style was conservative and showed influence from Frederik Vermehren. He became part of the circle around Selskabet for National Kunst through his acquaintance with Gustav Vermehren.

His Portrait of Master Carpenter Harald Olsen won the Academy's Annual Medal. He also received a gold medal for the painting En Gammel Bonde paa Toften in Munich.

Personal life
Wentorf married Alma Margrethe Nathalie Qvist (née 1861) on 18 April 1890.

Works
 Fra Trøstens Bolig, Motiv fra en Fattiggaard (1892m Hirschsprung Samling), En Collection)
 En Gudstjeneste paa Amager 1893, Statens Museum for Kunst)
 Den gamle Bonde paa Toften (1899, Fuglsang Art Museum, awarded gold medal in München in 1901)
 Et Sladderhjørne (1898)
  Portrætterne af tømrermester Harald Olsen (Tømmerlavets forsamlingssal)
 Hofjægermester Frederik Tesdorpf (1902)
Grev Ahlefeldts tre sønner (1903)
 Baron Frederik Rosenørn-Lehn (1904)
 Etatsråd Bock School master frøken Marie Kruse'' (1904)

References

External links

 Carl Wentorg at Kunstindeks Danmark

1863 births
1914 deaths
Artists from Copenhagen
Danish painters
Royal Danish Academy of Fine Arts alumni